The episodes of the Ah My Buddha and Amaenaideyo!! Katsu!! anime are based on the manga of the same name written by Toshinori Sogabe and Bohemian K. Both anime series are directed by Keitaro Motonaga and produced by Studio Deen, AT-X and VAP. The plot of the episodes follows the adventures of a teenage monk named Ikko Satonaka. He lives in a temple with six nuns, each representing one of the bosatsu of the six lower realms of the traditional Buddhist cosmology.

Ah My Buddha was broadcast on AT-X between July 1, 2005, and September 16, 2005. It is licensed by in North America by Media Blasters as Ah My Buddha. It is also licensed in Taiwan by Top-Insight International. Ah My Buddha uses two pieces of theme music.  by Amae-tai! is the series' opening theme, while "Happy Days" by Mai Nakahara is the series' ending theme. Five DVDs, containing the 12 episodes plus an original video animation, was released by VAP between August 24, 2005, and December 21, 2005.

On January 29, 2009, Media Blasters released the first DVD, called Amaenaideyo!! - The Aroused One, which contained the first four episodes of the anime. On March 17, 2009, Media Blasters released the second DVD, called Amaenaideyo!! - The Two Uncovered Paths, which contained the fifth to eighth episodes of the anime.

Amaenaideyo!! Katsu!! was broadcast on AT-X between January 4, 2006, and March 22, 2006. It is also licensed in Taiwan by Top-Insight International. Amaenaideyo!! Katsu!! uses two pieces of theme music.  by Amae-tai! is the series' opening theme, while "Lonesome Traveler" by Mai Nakahara is the series' ending theme. Five DVDs, containing the 12 episodes plus an original video animation, was released by VAP between February 22, 2006, and June 21, 2006.

Ah My Buddha

Amaenaideyo!! Katsu!!

References
General
 
 

Specific

External links
 Official VAP Ah My Buddha website 

Ah My Buddha